The Djiboutian Football Federation is the governing body of association football in Djibouti. It was founded in 1979, and affiliated to FIFA and the Confederation of African Football (CAF) in 1994, and has been a member of the Union of Arab Football Associations (UAFA) since 1998. The Federation oversees the Djibouti Premier League and the national team.

Logos

See also
Football in Djibouti
Djibouti Premier League
Djibouti national football team
Djibouti Cup
Stade du Ville

References

External links
Djibouti at the FIFA website.
 Djibouti at CAF Online

Djibouti
Football in Djibouti
Sports organizations established in 1979
1979 establishments in Djibouti
Football